Vergil Andronache (also known as Virgil Andronache; born 16 September 1970) is a Romanian football manager and former football player. After spending most of his career as a player and as a manager with Sportul Studențesc, in 2018 he became the coach of CFR II Cluj, and in 2019 he moved to FCSB to work as an assistant.

Club career
Andronache played professional football for only one club in his career, his former youth side Sportul Studențesc București.

Coaching career
After ending his playing career he stayed at Sportul Studențesc and began coaching their youth teams. Later he was appointed manager of the youth center, but also the manager of the first squad of the club, between 2012 and 2013. After the bankruptcy of Sportul, Andronache took some young players and moved to Juniorul București, then to Viitorul Domnești, where he managed to end as runner-up in the Liga III.

Over time Andronache promoted many talented players, Sportul's youth center being one of the most productive in the country. From the last generation of Sportul, saved by Andronache by taking them to Juniorul, then to Domnești, a few names stand out, the likes of Octavian Vâlceanu, Paul Pațurcă, Bogdan Barbu or Mihai Dobrescu.

After a short spell at the second team of CFR Cluj, Andronache signed a contract with FCSB as an assistant coach, then, on 2 August 2019, he was named as the caretaker manager of the first squad, after the departure of Bogdan Andone.

Managerial statistics

References

External links
 
 Vergil Andronache at fcsb.ro 

1970 births
Living people
People from Olt County
Romanian footballers
FC Sportul Studențesc București players
Romanian football managers
FC Sportul Studențesc București managers
FC Steaua București assistant managers
FC Steaua București managers
Association footballers not categorized by position